Stephen Philip Lansdown CBE (born 30 August 1952) is an English-born Guernsey billionaire. He co-founded the British financial services firm Hargreaves Lansdown with Peter Hargreaves. He is a founder of Bristol Sport and majority shareholder of Bristol Bears, Bristol Flyers, and Bristol City Football Club.

According to The Sunday Times Rich List in 2019, Lansdown is worth £1.72 billion.

Career
Educated at Thornbury Grammar School in Gloucestershire and trained as an accountant, Lansdown started Hargreaves Lansdown trading from a bedroom in 1981.

In April 2009, he sold a stake of 4.7% in Hargreaves Lansdown for a sum of £47.2million, which he put towards the cost of building Bristol City's new football stadium. He was reported in September 2012 to have announced his intention to quit Hargreaves Lansdown in November 2012. Lansdown has a holiday home in the South of France.

According to Hargeaves Lansdown's notifiable director deals, on 7 October 2010 he sold (at 429.00p) 13,560,843.00 shares at a value of £58,176,016.47. In 2013, he also bought basketball club Bristol Flyers. As of September 2015 his net worth was reported to be down to $1.88 billion.

Lansdown sold 2.2% of his shares in Hargreaves Lansdown in April 2020 at a total value of £160 million, which reduced his stake in the firm to 7%.

In August 2020 it was announced that Lansdown would receive £18.6 million in dividends after Hargreaves Lansdown's profits increased by 24% to £378.3 million in the 12 months leading up to 30 June 2020.

Honours
Lansdown was appointed Commander of the Order of the British Empire (CBE) in the 2017 Birthday Honours for services to business and the community in Bristol.

Family
He is married with two children.

References

English businesspeople
English football chairmen and investors
English rugby union chairmen and investors
1952 births
Living people
Guernsey billionaires
Commanders of the Order of the British Empire